Toulon is a city in Stark County, Illinois, United States. The population was 1,292 at the 2010 census. It is the county seat of Stark County. Toulon is part of the Peoria, Illinois Metropolitan Statistical Area, and is the northwestern terminus of the Rock Island Trail State Park.

Geography
Toulon is located at  (41.094495, -89.862218).

Schools
Stark County High School and Stark County Junior High are located in Toulon.

Demographics

As of the census of 2000, there were 1,400 people, 555 households, and 355 families residing in the city. The racial makeup of the city was 98.64% White, 0.21% African American, 0.50% Native American, 0.07% Asian, 0.07% from other races, and 0.50% from two or more races. Hispanic or Latino of any race were 0.43% of the population.

There were 555 households, out of which 29.7% had children under the age of 18 living with them, 52.8% were married couples living together, 9.0% had a female householder with no husband present, and 36.0% were non-families. 33.2% of all households were made up of individuals, and 20.2% had someone living alone who was 65 years of age or older. The average household size was 2.32 and the average family size was 2.95.

In the city, the population was spread out, with 23.3% under the age of 18, 6.6% from 18 to 24, 23.9% from 25 to 44, 19.4% from 45 to 64, and 26.8% who were 65 years of age or older. The median age was 42 years. For every 100 females, there were 80.4 males. For every 100 females age 18 and over, there were 78.7 males.

The median income for a household in the city was $31,792, and the median income for a family was $40,078. Males had a median income of $32,353 versus $20,556 for females. The per capita income for the city was $16,219. About 6.1% of families and 7.4% of the population were below the poverty line, including 9.8% of those under age 18 and 6.3% of those age 65 or over.

Notable people
Charlie Hall, MLB outfielder for the New York Metropolitans
Johnny Walker, MLB catcher for the Philadelphia Athletics
Ashton C. Shallenberger, 15th Governor of Nebraska from 1909 to 1911.
Merritt Heaton, who appeared at age 97 on the Tonight Show as the Oldest Active Farmer

References

Cities in Stark County, Illinois
Cities in Illinois
County seats in Illinois
Peoria metropolitan area, Illinois
Populated places established in 1841
1841 establishments in Illinois